"If I Never See You Again" was the first single from Wet Wet Wet's fifth studio album, 10 (1997). It was released on 10 March 1997 and reached number three on the UK Singles Chart. Marti Pellow recorded his own version of the song for inclusion on his 2002 album, Marti Pellow Sings the Hits of Wet Wet Wet & Smile.

Track listings

UK CD1
 "If I Never See You Again" – 3:48
 "Straight from My Heart" – 4:37
 "If I Never See You Again" (acoustic) – 3:57

UK CD2 (limited edition with four postcards)
 "If I Never See You Again" – 3:48
 "Straight from My Heart" – 4:37
 "Qu'est-ce que c'est?" – 2:50
 "If I Never See You Again" (synth string version) – 3:48

UK cassette single
 "If I Never See You Again" – 3:48
 "Straight from My Heart" – 4:37

European CD single
 "If I Never See You Again" – 3:48
 "Straight from My Heart" – 4:37
 "Qu'est-ce que c'est?" – 2:50
 "If I Never See You Again" (acoustic version) – 3:57

Credits and personnel
Credits are lifted from the UK CD1 liner notes and the 10 booklet.

Studio
 Recorded between April and May 1996 at Sarm Hook End Manor (Checkendon, England)

Personnel

 Terry Britten – writing
 Graeme Clark – writing, production
 Graham Lyle – writing
 Marti Pellow – writing
 Graeme Duffin – all guitars, production
 Fiachra Trench – string arrangement and conducting
 Bob Clearmountain – mixing
 Ian Morrow – programming
 Paul Wright – engineering
 James Brown – engineering
 Tim Wills – engineering assistant

Charts

Weekly charts

Year-end charts

References

 

1997 singles
1997 songs
Mercury Records singles
Songs written by Graeme Clark (musician)
Songs written by Graham Lyle
Songs written by Marti Pellow
Songs written by Terry Britten
Wet Wet Wet songs